21st Century Girl may refer to:

 21st Century Girl (album), by Brazzaville, or the title song, 2008
 "21st Century Girl" (song), by Willow Smith, 2011
 "21st Century Girls", a song by BTS from the 2016 album Wings
 "21st Century Girl", a song by Joey Ramone from the 2012 album ...Ya Know?

See also
 21st Century Girls, a 1990s British band